The Exorcist III is a 1990 American supernatural horror film written and directed by William Peter Blatty. It is the third installment in the Exorcist series, an adaptation of Blatty's Exorcist novel Legion (1983), and the final installment in Blatty's "Faith Trilogy". It stars George C. Scott, Brad Dourif, Ed Flanders, Jason Miller, Scott Wilson and Nicol Williamson.

The Exorcist III is set fifteen years after the original film, ignoring the events of Exorcist II: The Heretic. Though the original movie initially occurred in 1973, the year of its release, the year that Karras died in this movie is listed as 1975 on his headstone, placing the events of the original movie in 1975. It follows a character from the first film, Lieutenant William F. Kinderman, who investigates a series of demonic murders in Georgetown that have the hallmarks of the Gemini, a deceased serial killer. Blatty based aspects of the Gemini Killer on the real-life Zodiac Killer, one of several serial killers who enjoyed the original Exorcist.

Blatty, who wrote the original Exorcist novel (1971) and the screenplay for its 1973 film adaptation, conceived The Exorcist III with Exorcist director William Friedkin attached to direct. When Friedkin left the project, Blatty adapted the script into a bestselling novel, Legion (1983); Morgan Creek Productions bought the film rights, with Blatty as director. To Blatty's frustration, Morgan Creek demanded extensive last-minute changes, including the addition of an exorcism sequence for the climax. Though some of the original footage appears permanently lost, Scream Factory released a "director's cut" closer to Blatty's vision in 2016, with footage assembled from various sources.

Following the critical and commercial failure of Exorcist II: The Heretic, The Exorcist III received mixed reviews and made modest returns at the box office.

Plot
In 1990, fifteen years after Regan MacNeil's exorcism in 1975, Father Dyer and Lieutenant William F. Kinderman reminisce about Father Damien Karras. The following night, an incident at a church occurs indicating the presence of an evil supernatural entity, which causes a crucifix to open its eyes. The next scene then follows with the perspective of a man walking on the streets speaking of a dream of "falling down a long flight of steps", suggesting that someone is committing murders linked to Karras' death.

The next morning, Kinderman is called to find the body of Thomas Kintry, a Black youth. The fingerprints at the crime scenes do not match, indicating a different person was responsible for each murder. Kinderman reveals to the hospital staff that the murders fit the modus operandi of James Venamun, or "The Gemini Killer", a serial killer who was executed fifteen years prior.

Kinderman visits the head of a psychiatric ward, Dr. Temple, who relates the history of one of his patients. The patient was found wandering aimlessly fifteen years previously with amnesia. He was locked up, catatonic until he became violent and claimed to be the Gemini Killer. Kinderman sees that the patient is his old friend Damien Karras. Karras' form appears to briefly change into that of the Gemini Killer. He expresses ignorance of Karras but boasts of killing Father Dyer.

That night, a nurse is murdered and Dr. Temple commits suicide. Kinderman returns to see Karras, who once again changes into the Gemini Killer. The Gemini explains that he is being aided by a "Master" – the same entity who had previously possessed Regan MacNeil. The "Master" was furious at being exorcised by Karras, and is exacting its revenge by using Karras' body as a conduit for the Gemini to continue his killing spree. Each evening, the soul of the Gemini leaves the body of Karras and possesses the other patients elsewhere in the hospital, using them to commit the murders. The Gemini also reveals he had forced Dr. Temple to bring Kinderman to him.

The Gemini possesses an old woman and attempts to murder Kinderman and his family at their home, but the attack abruptly ends when Father Paul Morning arrives at the hospital and begins to perform an exorcism on Karras. The "Master" intervenes, taking over Karras' body, and Morning is severely mutilated. Kinderman rushes back to the hospital and attempts to euthanize Karras. The possessed Karras then torments and attempts to kill Kinderman. Morning manages to regain consciousness and tells Karras to fight. Karras regains his free will briefly and cries to Kinderman to shoot, killing Karras and freeing him from both the Gemini and his "Master". Later, Kinderman watches Karras' funeral. The year of Karras' death is listed as 1975 on his tombstone.

Cast

Production

Development
William Peter Blatty, who wrote the original Exorcist novel and the screenplay for its film adaptation, initially had no desire to write a sequel. However, he eventually came up with a story titled Legion, featuring Lieutenant Kinderman, a prominent character in the original Exorcist novel (though he played a minor role in the eventual film), as the protagonist. Blatty conceived Legion as a feature film with William Friedkin, director of The Exorcist, attached to direct. Despite the critical and commercial failure of the previous sequel, Warner Bros. was keen to proceed with Blatty and Friedkin's plans for another Exorcist film. Blatty said that "everybody wanted Exorcist III… I hadn't written the script, but I had the story in my head… and Billy [Friedkin] loved it". Friedkin, however, soon left the project due to conflicting opinions between him and Blatty on the film.

The project went into development hell, and Blatty wrote Legion as a novel instead, published in 1983. It was a bestseller. Blatty then decided to turn the book back into a screenplay. Film companies Morgan Creek and Carolco both wanted to make the film; Blatty decided upon Morgan Creek after Carolco suggested the idea of a grown-up Regan MacNeil giving birth to possessed twins. Blatty offered directorial responsibilities to John Carpenter, who liked his script; however, Carpenter backed out when it became clear that Blatty wanted to direct the movie himself and also because of creative differences regarding the ending of the movie. Despite this, they remained friends. As per the stipulations for his deal with Morgan Creek, Blatty was to direct the movie himself, and it was to be filmed on location in Georgetown.

Casting
The central role of Lt. Kinderman had to be recast, as Lee J. Cobb, who played the part in The Exorcist, had died in 1976. Oscar-winner George C. Scott signed up for the role, impressed by Blatty's screenplay: "It's a horror film and much more… It's a real drama, intricately crafted, with offbeat interesting characters… and that's what makes it genuinely frightening".

Several cast members from Blatty's previous film The Ninth Configuration (1980) appear in The Exorcist III: Jason Miller, reprising the role of Father Damien Karras from The Exorcist (billed only as "Patient X" in the end credits); Ed Flanders, taking on the role of Father Dyer (previously played by William O'Malley); Nicol Williamson and Scott Wilson.

There are also cameo appearances by basketball players Patrick Ewing, John Thompson, model Fabio, ex-Surgeon General C. Everett Koop, television host Larry King, and an early appearance by Samuel L. Jackson in a dream sequence.

Zohra Lampert, who plays Kinderman's wife, is remembered for her lead role in another horror film, 1971's Let's Scare Jessica to Death.

Filming
With an $11 million budget, the tentatively-titled Exorcist: Legion was shot on location in Georgetown for eight weeks in mid-1989. Additional interior filming took place in DEG Studios in Wilmington, North Carolina. Blatty completed principal photography of the film on time, and only slightly over budget. However, four months later, Morgan Creek informed Blatty that a new ending had to be shot. Blatty said that "James Robinson, the owner of the company, his secretary had insisted to him that this has nothing to do with The Exorcist. There had to be an exorcism". 20th Century Fox put up an additional $4-million in post-production to film an effects-laden exorcism sequence featuring Nicol Williamson as Father Morning, a character added just for the new climax. Blatty had to make the best of it in the narrative while racing to complete the film. Blatty confirmed that when the possessed Karras speaks in an asexual voice, saying, "I must save my son, the Gemini", that this is, in fact, either a returned Pazuzu or, as Blatty put it, "Old Scratch himself" taking control. This ties into the revelation earlier in the film that the Gemini was sent into Karras' body as revenge for the Regan MacNeil exorcism. The altered voice in the climax is deliberately similar to that of Mercedes McCambridge, who did the uncredited voice of the demon in The Exorcist, and the role is essayed in The Exorcist III by Colleen Dewhurst, who was uncredited (actress Dewhurst was twice married to, and twice divorced from, actor George C. Scott).

One scene missing from the re-filmed climax, but which appears in the trailer, shows Karras/the Gemini "morphing" through a variety of faces. It was left out of the film because Blatty was not happy with the special effects work.

On the climactic exorcism scene, Blatty later said: "It's all right, but it's utterly unnecessary and it changes the character of the piece". Although at the time, Blatty told the press that he was happy to re-shoot the film's ending and have the story climax with a frenzy of special effects, apparently this compromise was forced on Blatty against his wishes:

The original story that I sold [Morgan Creek] (and that I shot) ended with Kinderman blowing away Patient X. There was no exorcism. But it was a Mexican stand-off between me and the studio. I was entitled to one preview, then they could go and do what they wanted with the picture. They gave me a preview but it was the lowest end preview audience I have ever seen in my life. They dragged in zombies from Haiti to watch this film. It was unbelievable. But I decided, better I should do it than anyone else. I foolishly thought: I can do a good exorcism, I'll turn this pig's ear into a silk purse. So I did it.

Working on the film, Brad Dourif recalled: "We all felt really bad about it. But Blatty tried to do his best under very difficult circumstances. And I remember George C. Scott saying that the folks would only be satisfied if Madonna came out and sang a song at the end!" Dourif feels that "the original version was a hell of a lot purer and I liked it much more. As it stands now, it's a mediocre film. There are parts that have no right to be there".

The execution-style ending that Blatty pitched to the studio - which was in the shooting script and actually filmed - differs radically from the ending of both the novel and the first screenplay adaption developed from the novel. The novel ends with the Gemini Killer summoning Kinderman to his cell for a final speech and then willingly dropping dead after his alcoholic, abusive father, a Christian evangelist, dies a natural death from a heart attack. As his motive for the killing was always to shame his father, the Gemini's purpose for remaining on Earth no longer exists and he kills Karras in order to leave his host body. In Blatty's original screenplay adaptation, the ending is similar to the novel except that the Gemini's death is not self-induced but forced supernaturally and suddenly by the death of his father. In both novel and early screenplay, the Gemini's motives for his murders are also given further context via a long series of flashbacks that portray his and his brother's childhood and their relationship with their father.

Release
The Exorcist III was first released in October 1989 in the European MIFED Film Market and then opened in 1,288 theaters in the United States on August 17, 1990. Unlike its predecessors, it was distributed by 20th Century Fox instead of Warner Bros. (though some distribution rights would later revert to WB). The film was released only a month before the Exorcist parody Repossessed, starring Linda Blair and Leslie Nielsen. Blair claimed that Exorcist III was rush-released ahead of Repossessed, hijacking the latter's publicity and forcing the comedy to be released a month later than was originally intended.

Critical response
, review aggregate website Rotten Tomatoes reported that 58% of critics gave the film positive write-ups based on 43 reviews, with a rating of 5.70/10. The critical consensus reads: "The Exorcist III is a talky, literary sequel with some scary moments that rival anything from the original".

British film critic Mark Kermode called it "a restrained, haunting chiller which stimulates the adrenaline and intellect alike", and New York Times reviewer Vincent Canby said "The Exorcist III is a better and funnier (intentionally) movie than either of its predecessors".

Critic Brian McKay of efilmcritic.com remarked that the movie is "not quite as chilling as the first story" yet "is at least a quality sequel", being worth watching but suffering from many "uneven" aspects.

People writer Ralph Novak began his review with, "as a movie writer-director, William Peter Blatty is like David Lynch's good twin: he is eccentric, original, funny and daring, but he also has a sense of taste, pace, and restraint - which is by way of saying that this is one of the shrewdest, wittiest, most intense and most satisfying horror movies ever made".

Owen Gleiberman of Entertainment Weekly wrote: "If Part II sequels are generally disappointing, Part IIIs are often much, much worse. It can seem as if nothing is going on in them except dim murmurings about the original movie — murmurings that mostly remind you of what isn't being delivered". He additionally labeled The Exorcist III "an ash-gray disaster [that] has the feel of a nightmare catechism lesson, or a horror movie made by a depressed monk".

In the British magazine Empire, film critic Kim Newman claimed that "the major fault in Exorcist III is the house-of-cards plot that is constantly collapsing".

Kevin Thomas of the Los Angeles Times called The Exorcist III "a handsome, classy art film" that "doesn't completely work but offers much more than countless, less ambitious films".

Audiences surveyed by CinemaScore gave the film a grade "C" on scale of A to F.

Box office
The Exorcist III opened in first place in its opening weekend, earning $9,312,219 in the United States and Canada. It grossed a total of $26,098,824 in the United States and Canada and $18 million internationally for a total of $44 million worldwide. Blatty attributed its poor box office performance to the title imposed by Morgan Creek, having always intended for the film to retain the title of the novel. During development and production, the film went under various titles, including The Exorcist: 1990. Morgan Creek and Fox insisted on including the word Exorcist in the title, which producer Carter DeHaven and Blatty protested against:

<blockquote>I begged them when they were considering titles not to name it Exorcist anything -- because Exorcist II was a disaster beyond imagination. You can't call it Exorcist III, because people will shun the box office. But they went and named it Exorcist III. Then they called me after the third week when we were beginning to fade at the box office and they said 'We'll tell you the reason: it's gonna hurt, you're not gonna like this – the reason is Exorcist II'''. I couldn't believe it! They had total amnesia about my warnings!</blockquote>

Awards and nominations
In 1991, the film won a Saturn Award from the Academy of Science Fiction, Fantasy & Horror Films, USA, for Best Writing (William Peter Blatty) and was nominated for Best Supporting Actor (Brad Dourif) and Best Horror Film. George C. Scott was also nominated for a Golden Raspberry Award for Worst Actor but lost to Andrew Dice Clay for The Adventures of Ford Fairlane.

Director's cut
Despite his misgivings about the studio-imposed reshoots, Blatty remarked on his pride in the finished version of Exorcist III: "It's still a superior film. And in my opinion, and excuse me if I utter heresy here, but for me… it's a more frightening film than The Exorcist". Blatty hoped to recover the deleted footage from the Morgan Creek vaults so that he might re-assemble the original cut of the film which he said was "rather different" from what was released, and a version of the film which fans of the Exorcist series have been clamouring for. In 2007, Blatty's wife reported on a fan site that "my husband tells me that it is Morgan Creek's claim that they have lost all the footage, including an alternative opening scene, in which Kinderman views the body of Karras in the morgue, right after his fall down the steps". However, film critic Mark Kermode has stated that the search for the missing footage is "ongoing".

Some pictures (lobby cards, stills) show a few deleted scenes from Blatty's original cut of the film:
 An alternative opening scene in which Kinderman views the body of Karras in the morgue after his fall down the stairs in the ending of the first movie. When Kinderman leaves the morgue, the heart monitor shows signs of life from the body of Karras.
 The aftermath of the death scene of the first murdered priest, where his dead body is shown holding his severed head while sitting.
 A longer version of the scene where Kinderman talks with the priest about the murders and when a demon face is shown on statue of the saint. Originally, an unseen intruder cuts the statue's head and places a knife in its hand.
 The exhumation of Damien Karras's body in Jesuit cemetery. Later it is discovered that dead body is actually from Brother Fain, a Jesuit who was tending Karras's body and who disappeared 15 years ago. Although this scene is deleted, parts of it are used in a new ending where Patient X/Karras is buried.
 Blatty's original cut did not have Jason Miller as Karras/Patient X in it, and it had a different isolation cell for scenes in which Kinderman talked with Patient X/Gemini killer. Some promotional photos show Patient X and Kinderman talking in the original cell.
 New exorcism ending that Blatty had to film also had small part deleted in which Karras/Patient X is morphing through many other faces. One theatrical trailer shows this deleted scene.

In March 2011, a fan edit called "Legion" appeared on the Internet, credited to a fan using the pseudonym Spicediver, which removed all exorcism elements and recreated the main story arc of the director's cut without the use of any lost footage. In 2012, cast member Dourif agreed to present a screening of the fan edit at the Mad Monster Party horror convention held in Charlotte, North Carolina, on March 25. Dourif introduced the film, and did a Q&A session with the audience afterwards.

In December 2015, Morgan Creek began hinting via its Twitter feed that the Director's Cut was discovered and would eventually be released. Blatty later wrote on his website: "[Morgan Creek] are planning a new Blu Ray of 'my cut'".

On October 25, 2016, Scream Factory released a two-disc Collector's Edition of the film, including the supposedly lost footage. The website states: "We know that the biggest question you might have is: Will there be a "Director's Cut" of the film? The answer is yes—but with some caveats. We are working on putting together a version that will be close to Blatty's original script using a mixture of various film and videotape sources that we have been provided with".

In speaking to the process of creating the Legion Director's cut, Blu-ray producer Cliff MacMillan explains further as to the journey to get there and the outcome: "We conducted an exhaustive search through a pallet of film assets from the original shoot to re-create William Peter Blatty's intended vision. Unfortunately, that footage has been lost to time. To that end, we turned to VHS tapes of the film's dailies to assemble the director's cut. However, even some of that footage was incomplete, so scenes from the theatrical re-shoot were used to fill in the gaps. This director's cut is a composite of varying footage quality from the best available sources".

Legacy
The film became a focal point of the trial of serial killer Jeffrey Dahmer. Detectives testified that Dahmer claimed to identify with the Gemini Killer and would play the film for some of his victims before killing them. Dahmer's final attempted victim, Tracy Edwards, testified that Dahmer would rock back and forth while chanting at various times and that he especially enjoyed a sequence with a possessed Karras. Dahmer went so far as to purchase yellow contact lenses to more resemble Miller, as well as to emulate another film character he admired, Emperor Palpatine from Return of the Jedi.

The book titled The Evolution of William Peter Blatty's The Exorcist III: From Concept to Novel to Screen by author Erik Kristopher Myers reveals the whole story behind the film's development, and has never-before-seen images, the original script, studio notes, various drafts of the story as it has evolved, and interviews with Blatty, Dourif, Kermode, Carpenter and many others associated with the film. Myers in an interview said that The Exorcist III "has sort of turned into horror genre's equivalent to Orson Welles' The Magnificent Ambersons'', in that it was originally a very classy film that the studio hacked apart and turned into a commercial piece […] I'm basically trying to chronicle how a film can get away from the auteur and be transformed into a purely commercial product".

References

External links

 Official Morgan Creek website
 
 
 
 
 The Exorcist III at the TCM Movie Database

The Exorcist films
1990 films
20th Century Fox films
1990 horror films
1990s serial killer films
American supernatural horror films
Alternative sequel films
Films about child death
Films based on American horror novels
Films directed by William Peter Blatty
Films scored by Barry De Vorzon
Films shot in North Carolina
Films shot in Washington, D.C.
Films set in 1990
Demons in film
Occult detective fiction
Religious horror films
American serial killer films
Morgan Creek Productions films
1990s English-language films
1990s American films